The El Viejo Volcano, (translates as The Old Man Volcano) is possibly an inactive volcano in Costa Rica, situated in the Cordillera Central range near the Poás Volcano and within the Juan Castro Blanco National Park.

References 

Stratovolcanoes of Costa Rica
Mountains of Costa Rica
Inactive volcanoes